Oretta Fiume (6 June 1919 – 22 April 1994) was an Italian actress who became a star during the Fascist era after winning a competition. One of her final screen roles was in La Dolce Vita (1960). She was born in Fiume (now Rijeka, Croatia) as Claudia Scrobogna and adopted her hometown as part of her stage name.

Selected filmography
 The Cuckoo Clock (1938)
 Der singende Tor (1939)
 In the Country Fell a Star (1939)
 Backstage (1939)
 La Dolce Vita (1960)

References

External links

Bibliography
 Gundle, Stephen. Mussolini's Dream Factory: Film Stardom in Fascist Italy. Berghahn Books, 2013.

1919 births
1994 deaths
Italian film actresses
People from Rijeka
20th-century Italian actresses
Actors from Rijeka